was a vice admiral in the Imperial Japanese Navy.

Biography
Matsumura was born in what is now Saga Prefecture where his father was a samurai and lieutenant commander in the navy of Saga Domain. He was a graduate of the 14th class of the Imperial Japanese Naval Academy in 1887. One of his classmates was the future Prime Minister Suzuki Kantarō. During the First Sino-Japanese War, he served in staff positions and did not see combat, returning to sea after the end of the war as navigator on the ironclad  in 1896. The following year, he graduated with honors from the first class of the Naval War College and was promoted to lieutenant commander. He was promoted to commander in October 1902. From July 1903.

At the start of the Russo-Japanese War, Matsumura was assigned as executive officer on the cruiser  and from January 1905, was executive officer of the battleship . Following the end of the war, from May 10, 1906, he was sent to the United Kingdom for studies, and was promoted to captain on September 28, 1907. He returned to Japan on May 23, 1908, becoming chief of staff of the IJN 2nd Fleet from November 20, 1908. From February 1, 1909, Matsumura was an instructor at the Naval College. On May 22, 1922, he received his first command, that of the battleship . On December 1, 1912 he was promoted to rear admiral. Early during World War I, he served as Commander of the Interim Southern Islands Defense Unit from October 1914 to August 1915 and as commander of the Training Fleet from December 1915 to September 1916. He was promoted to vice admiral on December 1, 1916 and assigned command of the Mako Guard District to December 1917, and the Ryojun Guard District from December 1918 to October 1920. He went on the reserve list on April 1, 1922 and died in 1932.

Honors
1905 -  Order of the Sacred Treasure, 4th class
1915 -  Order of the Rising Sun, 2nd class
1920 -  Order of the Sacred Treasure, 1st class

References

External links
 

1868 births
1932 deaths
Imperial Japanese Naval Academy alumni
Imperial Japanese Navy admirals
Naval War College (Japan) alumni
People from Saga Prefecture
Japanese military personnel of the Russo-Japanese War
Japanese military personnel of World War I